Ian Davidson (born 31 January 1947 in Goole) is an English former footballer who played as a central defender or a defensive midfielder in the Football League for Hull City, Scunthorpe United, York City, AFC Bournemouth and Stockport County.

References

1947 births
Living people
People from Goole
Footballers from the East Riding of Yorkshire
English footballers
Association football central defenders
Hull City A.F.C. players
Scunthorpe United F.C. players
York City F.C. players
AFC Bournemouth players
Stockport County F.C. players
English Football League players